Arakelyan, also transliterated as Arakelian, is an Armenian surname. Notable people with the surname include:

Arakelyan
Ararat Arakelyan (born 1984), Armenian footballer
Babken Arakelyan (1912–2004), Armenian historian
Eduard Arakelyan (born 1950), Armenian painter

Arakelian
Artashes Arakelian (1909–1993), Armenian economist
Hambardzum Arakelian (1865–1918), Armenian journalist, writer and activist
Marat Arakelian (1929-1983), Armenian astrophysicist

See also
Arakel (disambiguation)

Armenian-language surnames